Xucaw or Hytsau (Ossetian: Хуыцау) is the supreme god of the Ossetian mythology, who rules over all the heavenly spirits and deities (called zædtæ and dawĝytæ). 

His name is often being considered a cognate of Iranian Khuda (see Sogdian Xutāw, Khwarezmian Xudāw), although some other scholars claimed that it has Caucasian roots (see Lezgin xucar "god"), which, in turn, may have Iranian origins.

He is known by a number of epithets:

 Styr Xwycaw (Стыр Хуыцау, the Great God)
 Duneskænæg (Дунескæнæг, Creator of the Universe)
 Me Skænæg Xwycaw (Ме Скæнæг Хуыцау)
 Xwycæwtty Xwycaw (Хуыцæутты Хуыцау, God of the Gods)

He is still worshipped as the supreme creator god in Uatsdin, and is believed to reside in every living being, and to manifest in mankind as consciousness and worthy action.

References

Sources
 Schmitz, Timo. "Etseg Din – Caucasian paganism from Ossetia". 2015.

Ossetian mythology
Sky and weather gods